Athrotaxis cupressoides, is also known as pencil pine, despite being a species of the family Cupressaceae, and not a member of the pine family. Found either as an erect shrub or as a tree, this species is endemic to Tasmania, Australia. Trees can live for upwards of 1000 years, sustaining a very slow growth rate of approximately 12 mm in diameter per year.

As with all species in the Athrotaxis genus, A. cupressoides’ leaves are single-veined and arranged in spirals. Unique to A. cupressoides the leaves are 2-3mm long/wide, overlapping and closely compressed stem. This results in a scale like appearance. Two forms of woody cones act as the gametophyte structures, which mature approximately six months after pollination and are typically retained on the tree for up to one year. The female cones are spherical with pointed bract scales 12-15 mm in diameter. The male cones are much smaller 3-5 mm in diameter. The common name pencil pine is based on it being an evergreen conical-shaped tree which grows up to 20m, with trunks up to 1.5m in diameter. This shape is most prominent when found in subalpine or open alpine vegetation, however it can also occur as a rainforest tree. Bark is light brown and fibrous, becoming more furrowed with age.

The name Athrotaxis is derived from the Greek words athros meaning crowded and taxis  meaning arrangement. The species name cupressoides  in Greek means ‘resembling cypress’.

Distribution and Habitat 

Athrotaxis cupressoides  is an endemic native to Tasmania, Australia. Is distribution is primarily in the central and western mountain areas between 700 and 1300m above sea level, often around tarns or damp depressions on peaty or wet-rocky soils. Locations at which you may observe A. cupressoides include; the Central Plateau, the Great Western Tier, Mt. Field National Park, the westward mountains such as Cradle Mountain and scattered on the south of the island.

Typically Athrotaxis cupressoides are found in subalpine or open alpine vegetation. When found in montane rainforests (also known as cool temperate rainforests)  A. cupressoides dominates. These environments are typically composed of; a canopy containing Athrotaxis cupressoides, and Athrotaxis selaginoides (king billy pine), an understory containing  Nothofagus cunninghamii (myrtle beech) and Phyllocladus aspleniifolius  (celery-top pine), a shrub layer containing Olearia pinifolius (prickly daisybush) and Richea species,  and a ground covering of Astelia alpine (pineapple grass), Empodisma minus (spreading rope rush) and Gleichenia alpina (alpine coral fern).

In regions where both A. cupressoides  and A. selaginoides grow a third hybrid species can occasionally be found. These two species are so closely related they form the hybrid Athrotaxis x laxifolia.

Threats 

Athrotaxis cupressoides is a highly fire sensitive species, hence the oldest and most vigorous populations are located in damp regions. Major fires at the Walls of Jerusalem National Park and the Central Plateau Conservation Area during the summer of 1960 – 1961, and again in 2016, severely affected and reduced the population. The species’ poor adaption to fire and the added stress of regeneration being hampered by grazing animals makes recovery from these incidents difficult. Animals such as sheep, rabbits and native marsupials, have been observed to eat the seedlings, suckers and adult foliage leaving significant impact on the plants. loss of A. cupressoides populations is largely irreversible given the relatively high fuel loads of postfire vegetation communities that are dominated by resprouting shrubs. A. cupressoides is expected to contract to only the most fire-proof landscapes, given the regeneration failures and increased flammability together with an expected drier and warmer climate.

Signs of die back have also been associated with disease caused by an introduced strain of Phytophthora.

Taxonomy 
Athrotaxis cupressoides was previously under the family Taxodiaceae, which has now been merged with Cupressaceae.

Uses and cultivation 
Athrotaxis cupressoides currently has no recorded uses. The trunks are gnarled and unsuitable for uses as timber. The species is however occasionally grown and sold as an ornamental.

References

Cupressaceae
Endemic flora of Tasmania
Pinales of Australia
Trees of Australia
Trees of mild maritime climate
Ornamental trees
Vulnerable flora of Australia
Taxonomy articles created by Polbot
Taxa named by David Don
Plants described in 1838